Riverside Stadium is a ballpark located in Victoria, Texas which is the current home of the UHV Jaguars baseball team and the Victoria Generals of the Texas Collegiate League. It is the former home of the Victoria Rosebuds, who played in the AA classification Texas League from 1958 to 1961.  The stadium was opened in 1947 as a part of Riverside Park.

References

UHV Jaguars baseball
College baseball venues in the United States
Baseball venues in Texas
Buildings and structures in Victoria, Texas
Sports venues completed in 1947
1947 establishments in Texas